Tonight or Never is a 1961 French comedy film directed by Michel Deville and starring Anna Karina.

Cast
 Anna Karina as Valérie
 Claude Rich as Laurent
 Georges Descrières as Guillaume
 Jacqueline Danno as Martine
 Michel de Ré as Alex
 Guy Bedos as Jean-Pierre
 Eliane D'Almeida as Nicole
 Anne Tonietti as Anita
 Françoise Dorléac as Danièle

References

External links

1961 films
1961 comedy films
1960s French-language films
French black-and-white films
Films directed by Michel Deville
1960s French films